Akhtari Bai Faizabadi (7 October 1914 – 30 October 1974), also known as Begum Akhtar, was an Indian  singer and actress. Dubbed "Mallika-e-Ghazal" (Queen of Ghazals), she is regarded as one of the greatest singers of ghazal, dadra, and thumri genres of Hindustani classical music.

Begum Akhtar received the Sangeet Natak Akademi Award for vocal music in 1972, was awarded Padma Shri, and later a Padma Bhushan Award posthumously by the government of India.

Early life

Akhtari Bai Faizabadi was born on 7 October 1914 to Asghar Hussain, a lawyer and his second wife Mushtari. Asghar Hussain subsequently disowned Mushtari and his twin daughters Zohra and Bibbi (later known as Begum Akhtar).

Career
Akhtar was barely seven when she was captivated by the music of Chandra Bai, an artist attached to a touring theatre group. However at her uncle's insistence she was sent to train under Ustad Imdad Khan, the great sarangi exponent from Patna, and later under Ata Mohammed Khan of Patiala. Later, she travelled to Calcutta with her mother and learnt music from classical stalwarts like Mohammad Khan, Abdul Waheed Khan of Lahore, and finally she became the disciple of Ustad Jhande Khan.

Her first public performance was at the age of fifteen. The famous poet Sarojini Naidu appreciated her singing during a concert which was organised in the aid of victims of the 1934 Nepal–Bihar earthquake. This encouraged her to continue singing ghazals with more enthusiasm. She cut her first disc for the Megaphone Record Company, at that time. A number of gramophone records were released carrying her ghazals, dadras, thumris, etc. She was amongst the early female singers to give public concert, and break away from singing in mehfils or private gatherings, and in time came to be known as Mallika-e-Ghazal (Queen of Ghazal).

Begum Akhtar's good looks and sensitive voice made her an ideal candidate for a film career in her early years. When she heard great musicians like Gauhar Jaan and Malak Jan, however, she decided to forsake the glamour of the film world for a career in Indian classical music. Her supreme artistry in light classical music had its moorings in the tradition of pure classicism. She chose her repertoire in primarily classical modes: a variety of raags, ranging from simple to complex. After the advent of talkie era in India, Begum Akhtar acted in a few Hindi movies in the 1930s. East India Film Company of Calcutta approached her to act in "King for a Day" (alias Ek Din Ka Badshah) and Nal Damayanti in 1933.

Like others of that era, she sang her songs herself in all her films. She continued acting in the following years. Subsequently, Begum Akhtar moved back to Lucknow where she was approached by the famous producer-director Mehboob Khan, to act in Roti  which was released in 1942 and whose music was composed by the maestro Anil Biswas. "Roti" contained six of her ghazals but unfortunately due to some trouble with the producer, Mehboob Khan subsequently deleted three or four ghazals from the film. All the ghazals are available on Megaphone gramophone records. Begum Akhtar, meanwhile, left Bombay and returned to Lucknow. Her name appears differently in many film credits as Akhtaribai Fyzabadi, Akhtaribai Faizabadi, Akhtari and Begum Akhtar.

In 1945, Akhtari Bai married a Lucknow-based barrister, Ishtiaq Ahmed Abbasi, and became known as Begum Akhtar. However, after marriage, due to restrictions by her husband, she could not sing for almost five years and subsequently, fell ill and emotionally depressed. That is when her return to music was prescribed as a befitting remedy, and in 1949 she returned to the recording studios. She sang three ghazals and a dadra at Lucknow All India Radio station. She started crying afterwards and returned to singing in concerts,  which she continued to do unto death. She sang publicly in Lucknow, in a women's only concert in aid of the war with China, which was held in 1962.

Her voice matured with time, acquiring richness and depth. She sang ghazals and other light classical pieces, in her inimitable style. She has nearly four hundred songs to her credit. She was a regular performer on All India Radio. She usually composed her own ghazals and most of her compositions were raag based. She also sang the timeless Bengali classical song "Jochona Koreche Aari" (জোছনা করেছে আড়ি).

On 7 October 2017, Google dedicated a Doodle profile to her commemorating the 103rd birthday of Begum Akthar.

Death
During her last concert in Balaramapuram near Thiruvananthapuram in 1974, she raised the pitch of her voice as she felt that her singing had not been as good as she had wanted it to be and felt unwell. The stress she put herself under resulted in her falling ill and she was rushed to the hospital.

She died on 30 October 1974 in the arms of Nilam Gamadia, her friend, who invited her to Ahmedabad, which became her final performance.

Her tomb was a mango orchard within her home, 'Pasand Bagh' in Thakurganj area, of Lucknow. She was buried alongside her mother, Mushtari Sahiba. However, over the years, much of the garden has been lost to the growing city, and the tomb has fallen into disrepair. The marble graves enclosed in a red brick enclosure, were restored in 2012, along with their pietra dura style marble inlay. Attempts are on to convert her home built in 1936 in China bazaar, Lucknow into a museum.

Her disciples include Shanti Hiranand, who later received Padma Shri and wrote a biography Begum Akhtar: The Story of My Ammi (2005). Art critic S. Kalidas directed a documentary on her titled Hai Akhtari.

Discography
 Begum Akhtar has nearly four hundred songs to her credit

List
 See Begum Akhtar songs for comprehensive list.
 Naseeb Ka Chakkar | –
 "Kalyug Hai Jabse Aaya Maya Ne..."
Roti | Anna Sahab Mainkar
 "Wo Hans Rahe Hain Aah Kiye Jaa..."
 "Ulajh Gaye Nayanwa Chhute Nahin..."
 "Char Dino Ki Jawani Matwale..."
 "Ai Prem Teri Balihari Ho..."
 "Phir Fasle Bahaar Aayi Hai..."
 "Rehne Laga Hai Dil Me Andhera..."
 Panna Dai | Gyan Dutt
 "Hamen Yaad Teri Sataane Lagi..."
 "Main Raja Ko Apne Rijha Ke Rahungi..."
 Dana Pani | Mohan Junior
 "Ishq Mujhe Aur Kuchh To Yaad Nahi..."
 Ehsaan
 "Hamen dil mein basaa bhi lo.."

Filmography

Awards and recognition
 1968: Padma Shri
 1972: Sangeet Natak Akademi Award
 1975: Padma Bhushan (posthumously)

Bibliography
 In Memory of Begum Akhtar, by Shahid Ali Agha. US Inter Culture Associates, 1979.
 Great Masters of Hindustani Music, by Susheela Misra. Published by Hem Publishers, 1981. Chapter 26.
 Begum Akhtar: The Queen of Ghazal, by Sutapa Mukherjee. Rupa & Co, 2005, .
 Begum Akhtar: The Story of My Ammi, by Shanti Hiranand. Published by Viva Books, 2005, .
 Ae Mohabbat… Reminiscing Begum Akhtar, by Jyoti Sabharwal & Rita Ganguly, 2008, .
 Begum Akhtar: Love's Own Voice, by S. Kalidas. 2009, .

References

External links
 Biography of Beghum Akhtar
 An Article of Beghum Akhtar
 Beghum Akhtar -interesting insights

1914 births
1974 deaths
20th-century Indian Muslims
Indian women ghazal singers
Indian ghazal singers
Indian film actresses
20th-century Indian actresses
Actresses in Hindi cinema
Hindustani singers
Thumri
Indian women playback singers
Singers from Lucknow
People from Faizabad district
Recipients of the Padma Bhushan in arts
Recipients of the Padma Shri in arts
Recipients of the Sangeet Natak Akademi Award
Women Hindustani musicians
Women musicians from Uttar Pradesh
20th-century Indian women singers
20th-century Indian singers